Changshi (r. 1335–1337) was one of the last effective khans of the Chagatai Khanate. His father was prince Ebugen who was the son of Duwa, the Chagatai Khan.

Western sources claimed that he was quite tolerant toward Christians. Before his succession, Changshi sent the Yuan emperor Tugh Temur 170 Russian prisoners. However, he was probably Nestorian. He was given a pecuniary reward from the court of Yuan dynasty. He overthrew princes from the power of the khanate in 1334–1335. But he was murdered by his family in 1338 after a short period of his reign. He was succeeded by his younger brother, Yesun Temur.

References 

Turkestan Down to the Mongol Invasion - W. Barthold 
The Cambridge History of Iran - William Bayne Fisher, John Andrew Boyle, Ilya Gershevitch

1337 deaths
Chagatai khans
14th-century monarchs in Asia
Year of birth unknown